Raphaël Merkies (born 15 April 2002) is a French professional footballer who currently plays as a midfielder for Hong Kong Premier League club HKFC.

Club career
Having only been promoted to the HKFC first team ahead of the 2022–23 Hong Kong Premier League season, Merkies scored his first goal for the club in a Hong Kong FA Cup tie against Resources Capital.

Career statistics

Club

Notes

References

External links
 Raphaël Merkies at the HKFA
 Yau Yee Football League profile

Living people
2002 births
French people of Dutch descent
French footballers
Association football midfielders
Hong Kong Premier League players
Hong Kong FC players
French expatriate footballers
French expatriate sportspeople in Hong Kong
Expatriate footballers in Hong Kong